Ingmar Nordströms was a dansband from Växjö, Sweden that was established in 1955 by Ingmar Nordström. Their first appearance occurred in the Eringsboda folkpark. Their last appearance occurred in Växjö on 19 December 1991. In 1987, the band won a Grammis award in the  "Dansband of the Year" category.

Discography

Albums

Svensktoppen songs

Famous recordings 
 The Elephant Song
 One More Reggae for the Road
 Gösta Gigolo
 Tomelilla 6-5000
 Birdie Nam-Nam
 Gråa tinningars charm
 Tweedle-Dee Tweedle-Dum
 Dansa dansa

References

1955 establishments in Sweden
1991 disestablishments in Sweden
Dansbands
Musical groups established in 1955
Musical groups disestablished in 1991
Culture in Växjö